The 2021–22 Coupe de France preliminary rounds, Hauts-de-France was the qualifying competition to decide which teams from the leagues of the Hauts-de-France region of France took part in the main competition from the seventh round.

A total of twenty teams qualified from the Hauts-de-France preliminary rounds. In 2020–21, US Boulogne progressed furthest in the main competition, reaching the round of 16 before losing to Canet Roussillon FC.

Draws and fixtures
On 21 July 2021, the Oise district league published that 1024 teams from the region had entered the competition. Draws for the first two rounds were carried out separately by district leagues during July, with 818 teams in total entering at the first round stage, and 187 at the second round stage. The third round draw was published on 13 September 2021. The fourth round draw was published on 23 September 2021. The fifth round draw was made on 7 October 2021. The sixth round draw was made on 19 October 2021.

First round
These matches were played on 28 and 29 August 2021.

Second round
These matches were played on 4 and 5 September 2021, with one postponed until 12 September 2021.

Third round
These matches were played on 18 and 19 September 2021.

Fourth round
These matches were played on 2 and 3 October 2021, with two postponed until 10 October 2021.

Fifth round
These matches were played on 16 and 17 October 2021.

Sixth round
These matches were played on 30 and 31 October 2021.

References

preliminary rounds